Fairlies Knob is a national park in Queensland, Australia, 231 km north of Brisbane.

The estimated elevation of the terrain is 259 meters.

Wildlife 
The park is home to 165 species of animals and 250 species of plants.

References

See also

 Protected areas of Queensland

National parks of Queensland
Wide Bay–Burnett
Protected areas established in 1910
1910 establishments in Australia